The 2022 North Dakota State Bison baseball team represented North Dakota State University during the 2022 NCAA Division I baseball season. The Bison played their home games at Newman Outdoor Field adjacent to NDSU's campus. The team was coached by Tyler Oakes in his 1st season as head coach at NDSU. Oakes had been associated with NDSU Baseball since December of 2013. The Bison claimed their first Summit League Regular Season title during the season, winning every conference series played.
The Bison entered the Summit League Tournament as the No. 1 overall seed. They lost to Omaha to start the tournament, then beat South Dakota State to advance to the semifinals, before falling to Omaha yet again to be eliminated from the tournament. NDSU finished the season with a 31-19 record and a 17-5 record in the Summit League, the second of which is their best for the program since entering Division I.

Previous season
The Bison finished last season 42-19 and 20-11 in Summit League play. This led them to the Summit League Tournament where they won; beating Omaha and Oral Roberts to advance to their second NCAA Tournament berth since entering Division I. It was their first conference tournament title since 2014. 
NDSU entered the NCAA Tournament as the four seed in the Stanford Regional. The Bison lost to number 7 overall seed Stanford before winning their first NCAA Division I Tournament game against regional three seed Nevada. NDSU was eliminated from the tournament when they lost to number 17 overall seed UC Irvine.

Personnel

Roster
{| class="toccolours" style="border-collapse:collapse; font-size:90%;"
! colspan="9" style="" |2022 North Dakota State Roster
|-
| width="03" | 
| valigh="top" |
Pitchers
16 - Nolan Johnson - Freshman
18 - Jake Drew - Senior
22 - Hayden Style - Sophomore
24 - Evan Sankey - Senior
25 - Riley Johnson - Senior
27 - Ben Smith - Junior
28 - Tyler Kliniske - Junior
30 - Reese Ligtenberg - Freshman
31 - Max Loven - Junior
32 - Andrew Baumgart - Freshman
35 - Leland Wilson - Freshman
37 - Jaxon Edwards - Freshman
38 - Shea Zetterman - Junior
40 - Tristen Roehrich - Junior
44 - Skyler Riedinger - Freshman

|width="15"| 
|valign="top"|
Catchers
5 - Logan Williams - Senior
7 - Will Busch - Sophomore
15 - Bennett Freiter - Freshman

Infielders
2 - Peter Brookshaw - Junior
3 - Noah Dehne - Sophomore
9 - Garret Hill - Sophomore
12 - Drew Grindahl - Sophomore
13 - Druw Sackett - Junior
17 - Zach Kluvers - Freshman
26 - Carson Hake - Sophomore

|width="15"| 
| valign="top" |
Outfielders
1 - Terrell Huggins - Junior
6 - Calen Schwabe - Senior
19 - Cadyn Schwabe - Sophomore
20 - Chase Nett - Sophomore

Utility
4 - Charley Hesse (INF/OF) - Senior
8 - Caden Edwards (P/INF) - Freshman
10 - Cade Feeney (P/INF) - Sophomore
11 - Brock Anderson (UTIL/P) - Junior
14 - Wyatt Nelson (P/OF) - Sophomore
33 - Hunter Koep (P/INF) - Senior
34 - Joey Danielson (P/C) - Junior

|width="25"| 
|-
| colspan="4" style="font-size:8pt; text-align:center;"|''Reference:|}

Coaching staff

Schedule and results

Awards and honorsSummit League Coach of the Year HC Tyler Oakes First Team All-Summit League OF Calen Schwabe
 DH Logan WilliamsSecond Team All-Summit League C Will Busch
 1B Brock Anderson
 2B Druw Sackett
 SS Peter Brookshaw
 OF Jack Simonsen
 P Evan Sankey

Reference:Summit League All-Tournament Team'''
 P Cade Feeney
 2B Druw Sackett

Reference:

References 

North Dakota State
North Dakota State Bison baseball seasons
North Dakota State